Rosedale Presbyterian Church is a congregation of the Presbyterian Church Canada located at 129 Mount Pleasant Road in the Rosedale neighbourhood of Toronto, Ontario, Canada.

References

Rosedale, Toronto
Presbyterian churches in Toronto
20th-century Presbyterian church buildings in Canada